3-Nitroaniline, also known as meta-nitroaniline and m-nitroaniline, is a non-volatile stable solid commonly used as a raw material for dyes. 3-Nitroaniline is an aniline carrying a nitro functional group in position 3. It is stable in neutral, acidic or alkaline solutions and is classified as "not readily biodegradable" with "low bioaccumulation potential".

It is used as a chemical intermediate for azo coupling component 17 and the dyes disperse yellow 5 and acid blue 29.  The chemical is changed to other substances (dyestuffs and m-nitrophenol) during the dyeing process.

Synthesis 
It can be synthesized by nitration of benzamide followed by the Hofmann rearrangement of the 3-nitrobenzamide previously formed. It consist in treating the 3-nitrobenzamide with sodium hypobromite or sodium hypochlorite to transform the amide group into an amine.

See also

 2-Nitroaniline
 4-Nitroaniline

References

Anilines
Nitrobenzenes